The 2012–13 California Golden Bears men's basketball team represented the University of California, Berkeley in the 2012–13 NCAA Division I men's basketball season. This was head coach Mike Montgomery's fifth season at California. The Golden Bears played their home games at Haas Pavilion and participated in the Pac-12 Conference. They finished the season 21–12, 12–6 in Pac-12 play to finish in a three way tie for second place. They lost in the quarterfinals of the Pac-12 tournament to Utah. They received an at-large bid to the 2013 NCAA tournament where they defeated UNLV in the second round before losing in the third round to Syracuse.

Roster

Coaching staff

Schedule and results

|-
!colspan=9| Exhibition

|-
!colspan=9| Regular season

|-
!colspan=9| Pac-12 tournament

|-
!colspan=9| NCAA tournament

Notes
 March 2013 – Senior guard Allen Crabbe was named the 2012–13 Pac-12 Men's Basketball Player of the Year.

References

External links
CalBears.com 

California
California Golden Bears men's basketball seasons
California
California Golden Bears men's b
California Golden Bears men's b